Epimeciodes is a monotypic moth genus of the family Erebidae erected by George Hampson in 1926. Its only species, Epimeciodes abunda, was first described by Rudolf Felder and Alois Friedrich Rogenhofer in 1874. It is found in South Africa.

References

Endemic moths of South Africa
Calpinae
Monotypic moth genera